Grayling Airport  is a state-owned public-use airport located one mile (2 km) south of the central business district of Grayling, a city in the Yukon-Koyukuk Census Area of the U.S. state of Alaska.

Facilities 
Grayling Airport has one runway (15/33) with a gravel surface measuring 2,315 x 60 ft. (706 x 18 m).

Airlines and destinations 

Prior to its bankruptcy and cessation of all operations, Ravn Alaska served the airport from multiple locations.

References

External links 
 FAA Alaska airport diagram (GIF)
 Resources for this airport:
 
 
 

Airports in the Yukon–Koyukuk Census Area, Alaska